The Men's 50m freestyle event at the 2010 South American Games was held on March 28, with the heats at 10:00 and the Final at 18:00.

Medalists

Records

Results

Heats

Final

References
Heats
Final

Free 50m M